In graph theory, a T-Coloring of a graph , given the set T of nonnegative integers containing 0, is a function  that maps each vertex to a positive integer (color) such that if u and w are adjacent then . In simple words, the absolute value of the difference between two colors of adjacent vertices must not belong to fixed set T. The concept was introduced by William K. Hale. If T = {0} it reduces to common vertex coloring.

The T-chromatic number,  is the minimum number of colors that can be used in a T-coloring of G. 

The complementary coloring of T-coloring c, denoted  is defined for each vertex v of G by

where s is the largest color assigned to a vertex of G by the c function.

Relation to Chromatic Number

Proposition. .

Proof. Every T-coloring of G is also a vertex coloring of G, so  Suppose that  and  Given a common vertex k-coloring function  using the colors  We define  as

For every two adjacent vertices u and w of G,

so  Therefore d is a T-coloring of G. Since d uses k colors,  Consequently,

T-span 
The span of a T-coloring c of G is defined as

The T-span is defined as:

Some bounds of the T-span are given below:

 For every k-chromatic graph G with clique of size  and every finite set T of nonnegative integers containing 0, 

For every graph G and every finite set T of nonnegative integers containing 0 whose largest element is r, 

For every graph G and every finite set T of nonnegative integers containing 0 whose cardinality is t,

See also 
Graph coloring

References 

Graph coloring